The Mare aux Hippopotames (Lake of Hippopotamuses) is a lake and national park in Burkina Faso, created in 1937 and designated in 1977 as the only UNESCO Biosphere Reserve in the nation. The park was created around a freshwater lake and includes surrounding pools and marches in the flood plain of the Black Volta River, and surrounding forests. The park is home to about 100 hippos; about 1000 eco-tourists visit each year.

Mare aux Hippopotames is among the wetlands of international importance as defined by the Ramsar Convention.

References

External links
Mare aux Hippopotames at Birdlife.org
Mare aux Hippopotames at UNESCO

National parks of Burkina Faso
Ramsar sites in Burkina Faso
Biosphere reserves of Burkina Faso
Lakes of Burkina Faso
Protected areas established in 1937
Important Bird Areas of Burkina Faso
1937 establishments in Africa